Diego de Vargas Zapata y Luján Ponce de León y Contreras (1643–1704), commonly known as Don Diego de Vargas, was a Spanish Governor of the New Spain territory of Santa Fe de Nuevo México, to the US states of New Mexico and Arizona, titular 1690–1695, effective 1692–1696 and 1703–1704. He is known for leading the reconquest of the territory in 1692 following the Pueblo Revolt of 1680. This reconquest is commemorated annually during the Fiestas de Santa Fe in the city of Santa Fe.

Pueblo revolt and reconquest
On 10 August 1680, Pueblo people from various pueblos in northern New Mexico staged an uprising against Spanish colonists. They laid siege to the city of Santa Fe, forcing the colonists to retreat on 20 August. The Spanish colonists fled south to El Paso del Norte (now Ciudad Juárez, Mexico), where they remained in exile for the next 16 years.

In 1688, Capitan General y Governador Don Diego de Vargas was appointed Spanish Governor of New Mexico, though he did not arrive to assume his duties until 22 February 1691. He was assigned with the task of reconquering and pacifying the New Mexico territory for Spain. In July 1692, de Vargas and a small contingent of soldiers returned to Santa Fe. They surrounded the city and called on the Pueblo people to surrender, promising clemency if they would swear allegiance to the King of Spain and return to the Christian faith. After meeting with de Vargas, the Pueblo leaders agreed to surrender, and on 12 September 1692 de Vargas proclaimed a formal act of repossession. De Vargas’ repossession of New Mexico is often called a bloodless reconquest, since the territory was initially retaken without any use of force. 

De Vargas had prayed to the Virgin Mary, under her title La Conquistadora (Our Lady of Conquering Love), for the peaceful re-entry. Believing that she heard his prayer, he celebrated a feast in her honor. Today, this feast continues to be celebrated annually in Santa Fe as the Fiestas de Santa Fe. Part of those annual fiestas is a novena of masses in thanksgiving. Those masses are also done with processions from the Cathedral Basilica of St. Francis of Assisi to the Rosario Chapel. The actual statue of La Conquistadora is taken in the processions. After the novena is completed she is taken back to the Basilica. This event includes participation by local tribes as well as Latino descendants that reside in the area. In the second decade of the 21st century, members of Native American tribes and pueblos protested the pageant, recalling the subsequent retaking of Santa Fe. 

The focus of these protests was The Entrada—a reenactment of de Vargas's re-entry into Santa Fe that has long been seen as inaccurate by historians and culturally offensive by Native Americans. The most recent round of protests against The Entrada started in 2015. That year, silent protestors raised placards citing historical facts at odds with the narrative present when the re-enactors reached Santa Fe's historic Plaza to portray the retaking of the city. Protests in 2017 resulted in 8 arrests; though the charges were later dismissed. Following the protests and months of negotiation the Entrada was removed from The Santa Fe Fiesta celebration.

Statue
On June 18, 2020 the city of Santa Fe, New Mexico removed a Statue of Diego de Vargas that had been erected 150 years earlier. The statue was one of several removed as wider efforts to remove controversial statues across the United States.

Notable soldiers who traveled with Vargas
Ignacio Roibal (Roybal) – Owner of the now-historic Sena Plaza in Santa Fe.
Alonso Rael de Aguilar – Secretary of Government and War for de Vargas
 Juan de Ulibarrí – soldier and explorer of the Great Plains
Captain Don Fernando Durán y Chaves (b. 1651, d. Bet. 1712 - 1716) [For more detailed treatment see "El Palacio", Vol. 55, No. 4, pp. 103-121.Some emendations in this present work -"Origins of New Mexico Families" are the result of more data found.]

References

Citations

Sources 
New Mexico History

Diego de Vargas Article

See also
History of New Mexico

1643 births
1704 deaths
Colonial Mexico
History of New Mexico
Spanish colonization of the Americas
Colonial governors of Santa Fe de Nuevo México